Star Pilot is a 1966 Italian science-fiction film directed by Pietro Francisci. It stars Leonora Ruffo as Chaena

Plot

Chaena is the commander of a spaceship from the constellation Hydra, which has crashed on the island of Sardinia.

An Earth scientist, some technicians, their companions, and some Chinese agents are abducted by the aliens and forced to repair the ship.

With the ship repaired, the aliens decide to take the humans to Hydra for the purpose of genetic research, but while in flight, the humans mutiny.

Cast
 Leonora Ruffo as Kaela
 Mario Novelli (credited as Anthony Freeman) as Paolo Bardi
 Roland Lesaffre as Prof. Solmi
 Kirk Morris as Belsy
 Alfio Caltabiano as Artie
 Leontine Snell as Luisa Solmi
 Nando Angelini as Morelli
 Giovanni De Angelis as Giulio
 John Sun as Dr. Chang
 Antonio Ho as Chinese Secret Agent
 John Chen as Chinese Secret Agent
 Gordon Mitchell as Murdu (cameo appearance)

Reception

TV Guide found the movie poorly produced.

Production

Once in space, the film uses stock special-effects footage from Toho Studio's films  Invasion of Astro-Monster and Gorath to depict a pursuit of Chaena's ship and an ecological catastrophe on Earth.

In the fall of 1977, to quickly capitalize on success of Star Wars, the film was dubbed in English and released in the United States under a new title. The English dub included references to "Star Fleet", "Star Fleet Command", "Warp Speed", and "Impulse Drive", as used in the Star Trek television series.

Home release

The film was released as a double movie pack with Battle Beyond the Sun. It was also released in 2000 on Blu-ray.

References

External links

1960s science fiction adventure films
1966 films
Films directed by Pietro Francisci
1960s Italian-language films
Italian science fiction adventure films
Films shot in Rome
Space adventure films
Films shot in Sardinia
Films scored by Nico Fidenco
1960s Italian films
Italian post-apocalyptic films